The Bloemfontein Ring Road, also known as The Bloemfontein bypass is a halfway ring road that circles the city of Bloemfontein, South Africa.

Route
The Ring road begins north of Bloemfontein, at the R30 exit on the N1 Highway. The Route continues west around Bloemfontein passing the R700 and R64. It then crosses the N8 highway which intersects through Bloemfontein Central.

The ring road continues South, passing the R706, to reach an interchange with the N6, where it ends.

See also
Ring Roads in South Africa

References

Ring roads in South Africa
N1 (South Africa)